The 1970–71 NBA season was the Buffalo Braves inaugural season in the NBA. With a roster made up primarily of castoffs, the Braves got off on the right foot by beating the Cleveland Cavaliers 107–92 at the Buffalo Memorial Auditorium on October 14.  However, the Braves would drop their next nine as they took on established NBA teams on the way to finishing in last place in the Atlantic Division. The Braves' record was 22–60, which was 7 games better than the Cleveland Cavaliers, their partners in expansion.

Offseason

NBA Draft

The 1970 NBA Draft was held on March 23, 1970 in New York City. The Braves first ever draft pick was John Hummer from Princeton, as he was selected with the 15th overall selection at the 1970 NBA Draft. Hummer, a 6'9" center from Washington, DC, averaged 17.5 points per game in 25 games with the Tigers during the 1969-70 season. Hummer led Princeton with a .487 field goal percentage, as well as leading the team with 9.5 rebounds per game.

Cornell Warner was selected by Buffalo in the second round, 24th overall. Warner, another center, played for Jackson State University from 1967-1970.

Expansion Draft
The 1970 NBA Expansion Draft was held on May 11, 1970, with the Braves and two other expansion franchises, the Cleveland Cavaliers and the Portland Trail Blazers participating in the event.

The Braves most notable selection was power forward Bailey Howell from the Boston Celtics. Howell was a six time NBA all-star, however, immediately after the draft, he was traded to the Philadelphia 76ers in exchange for power forward Bob Kauffman, who had played the 1969-70 season with the Chicago Bulls. Kauffman saw limited playing time with the Bulls, averaging 4.3 points per game while averaging 12.1 minutes per game in 64 games with Chicago.

Another selection was 10-year NBA veteran, forward/center Ray Scott from the Baltimore Bullets.  The Braves management were looking forward to his leadership on the team; however, due to contradictory language in his Baltimore contract that provided him a loophole to become a free agent after the 1969-70 NBA season.  The Braves did not exercise his option under the reserve clause because they believed it was a two-year contract.  Scott was free to sign with the Virginia Squires in the American Basketball Association.  The league compensated the Braves due to losing a chosen player from Expansion Draft by promoting their 3rd round pick to a 2nd round pick (24th overall) in the 1971 NBA Draft.

Roster
{| class="toccolours" style="font-size: 95%; width: 100%;"
|-
! colspan="2" style="background-color: #002F6C;  color: #DAAA00; text-align: center;" | Buffalo Braves 1970–71 roster
|- style="background-color: #DAAA00; color: #002F6C;   text-align: center;"
! Players !! Coaches
|-
| valign="top" |
{| class="sortable" style="background:transparent; margin:0px; width:100%;"
! Pos. !! # !! Nat. !! Name !! Ht. !! Wt. !! From
|-

Roster Notes
 Forward Mike Silliman originally donned jersey #27 but later switched to #4.
 Guard Freddie Crawford played in only 15 games before he was traded away to the Philadelphia 76ers in November.

Regular season

October
The Braves won their first game in franchise history, defeating the Cleveland Cavaliers 107-92 at the Buffalo Memorial Auditorium on October 14, 1970. Don May led Buffalo with 24 points in the historic victory. This would be the Braves only victory in the month of October, as they closed out the month on a six game losing streak. On October 24, May scored 34 points in a 114-95 loss to the Detroit Pistons. Buffalo had a 1-6 record during the month, sitting in last place in the Atlantic Division, six games behind the first place New York Knicks.

November
Buffalo dropped their first three games of November, extending their losing skid to nine games and dropping the team to a 1-9 record. The Braves snapped their losing streak with a 103-91 victory over the Cleveland Cavaliers on November 7, which was the second time Buffalo had defeated Cleveland in the season. Bob Kauffman led the way for Buffalo with 24 points in 30 minutes. In their following game, Buffalo won consecutive games for the first time in team history, defeating the Atlanta Hawks 134-118, as Kauffman scored 35 points to lead the team, while Bill Hosket grabbed 17 rebounds. After dropping their next two games, the Braves returned to the win column with a 112-103 win over the Seattle SuperSonics on November 16, as Don May led the team in scoring with 25 points and John Hummer recorded a double-double with 10 points and 12 rebounds. On the next night, the Braves won their first ever road game, as they defeated the Portland Trail Blazers 102-101. The Braves struggled during the rest of the month, earning a 2-5 record over their remaining seven games, with wins over the Phoenix Suns and Portland Trail Blazers. In their win over Phoenix, Kauffman recorded a triple-double, as he scored 26 points, grabbed 17 rebounds, and recorded 11 assists in the 112-106 win.

The Braves finished November with a 6-10 record during the month. Overall, their record was 7-16, as the club remained in the Atlantic Division cellar, 11 games behind the first place New York Knicks.  Also during this time, the Braves traded guard Freddie Crawford to the Philadelphia 76ers for a future draft pick.

December
Buffalo began December with a narrow 117-116 loss to the Boston Celtics. The Braves returned to the win column on December 4, defeating the powerful New York Knicks 97-91, as Dick Garrett led the team with 23 points and 10 rebounds. Bob Kauffman scored 22 points and recorded 13 rebounds, while Don May scored 20 points with 10 rebounds in the win. Following the victory over New York, the Braves lost their next five games. In the Braves 108-106 loss to the Cleveland Cavaliers, Kauffman scored 40 points, which was the first time in team history that a player reached 40 points in a game. On December 12, the Braves returned to the win column, beating the Detroit Pistons 93-92. After a loss to Atlanta in their next game, the Braves defeated the Los Angeles Lakers 113-111 in overtime, as Kauffman led the way with 34 points and 11 rebounds. The Braves lost their next game against Boston, but returned to the win column in their following game, crushing the Cleveland Cavaliers 113-94. In their win, six different Braves players recorded 10 or more points. Buffalo struggled for the remainder of the month, losing their final seven games of December.

The club recorded a 4-15 record in December, bringing their overall win–loss record to 11-31 at the end of the month. The Braves continued to be in last place in the Atlantic Division, 20 games behind the first place New York Knicks.

January
Buffalo lost their first game of the new year, losing 115-103 to the Cincinnati Royals, extending their losing skid to eight games. In their next game, the Braves halted their losing streak with a 115-108 victory over the San Francisco Warriors, as Bob Kauffman led the way with 20 points and 17 rebounds. Following the win over the Warriors, the Braves lost their next three games, including a 141-113 blowout loss to the Chicago Bulls. Buffalo ended their losing streak with an impressive 119-113 win over the Portland Trail Blazers, in which eight players scored double digits in points for the Braves. Buffalo then lost their next four games, including an embarrassing 111-79 loss to the Cleveland Cavaliers. The club responded with a three game winning streak after that loss to Cleveland, as the Braves defeated the Portland Trail Blazers twice, as well as a win over the San Diego Rockets. Buffalo then concluded January on a five game road trip, in which they lost every game.

Buffalo earned a record of 5-13 during the month of January. Overall, the Braves were 16-44, falling to 24.5 games behind the Atlantic Division leaders, the New York Knicks.

February
Buffalo began February with two more losses in a row, extending their losing skid to seven games. The club ended their losing streak with a 106-99 victory over the New York Knicks, which was the Braves second victory over New York during the season, as Buffalo was led by Don May and his 29 points. In their following game, the Braves defeated the Cleveland Cavaliers 111-106, as May led the team with 35 points. Following their two game winning streak, Buffalo would end the month by dropping seven of their remaining eight games. Their lone win was a 118-114 decision over the Washington Bullets on February 17.

The Braves finished February with a 3-9 record, dropping their overall win–loss record to 19-53, remaining in the Atlantic Division cellar and dropping to 27 games behind the first place New York Knicks.

March
The Braves began March with a 131-118 loss to the Los Angeles Lakers. In the loss, Don May scored 40 points for Buffalo. In their next game, Buffalo dropped a close 116-113 game to the Milwaukee Bucks, extending their losing streak to seven games. The Braves ended their losing streak and won their twentieth game of the season with a 120-109 victory over the Cleveland Cavaliers on March 6. In their following game, the Braves defeated the Portland Trail Blazers 114-98 to win consecutive games for the first time since the middle of February. After a loss to the San Diego Rockets, the Braves defeated the Los Angeles Lakers on the road 116-109 as seven different players earned 10 or more points for the Braves. Buffalo would finish the season with four straight losses.

The Braves finished March with a 3-7 record, bringing their final regular season win–loss record to 22-60, finishing in fourth place in the four team Atlantic Division, 30 games behind the first place New York Knicks.

Season standings

Record vs. opponents

Game log

Player statistics
Note: GP= Games played; MPG = Minutes per game; FG% = Field goal percentage; FT% = Free throw percentage; RPG = Rebounds per game; APG = Assists per game; PPG = Points per game

Awards and honors
 Bob Kauffman, NBA All-Star

Transactions
The Braves were involved in the following transactions during the 1970–71 season.

Trades

Free agents

Additions

Subtractions

References

 Braves on Database Basketball
 Braves on Basketball Reference

Buffalo Braves seasons
Buffalo
Buffalo
Buffalo